Lacey Green is a council estate  in the upmarket area of Wilmslow in the English county of Cheshire. The population at the 2011 Census was 4,718.  It lies between Wilmslow's town centre and the village of Styal. Historically, its name was Lacy Green.

Lacey Green contains a housing estate, served by a range of local shops, a sports pavilion and a park providing open grassland, a children's play area and a BMX track. 
Lacey Green is 13 miles from Manchester Town Centre and 0.8 miles from Handforth town centre

References

External links

Wilmslow